The European Atomic Energy Community (EAEC or Euratom) is an international organisation established by the Euratom Treaty on 25 March 1957 with the original purpose of creating a specialist market for nuclear power in Europe, by developing nuclear energy and distributing it to its member states while selling the surplus to non-member states. However, over the years its scope has been considerably increased to cover a large variety of areas associated with nuclear power and ionising radiation as diverse as safeguarding of nuclear materials, radiation protection and construction of the International Fusion Reactor ITER.

It is legally distinct from the European Union (EU) although it has the same membership, and is governed by many of the EU's institutions; but it is the only remaining community organisation that is independent of the EU and therefore outside the regulatory control of the European Parliament. Since 2014, Switzerland has also participated in Euratom programmes as an associated state.

The United Kingdom ceased to be a member of the organisation on 31 January 2020. However, under the terms of the UK–EU Trade and Cooperation Agreement, the United Kingdom participates in Euratom as an associated state following the end of the transition period on 31 December 2020.

History

The Common Assembly proposed extending the powers of the European Coal and Steel Community to cover other sources of energy. However, Jean Monnet, ECSC architect and President, wanted a separate community to cover nuclear power. Louis Armand was put in charge of a study into the prospects of nuclear energy use in Europe; his report concluded that further nuclear development was needed to fill the deficit left by the exhaustion of coal deposits and to reduce dependence on oil producers. However, the Benelux states and Germany were also keen on creating a general single market, although it was opposed by France due to its protectionism, and Jean Monnet thought it too large and difficult a task. In the end, Monnet proposed the creation of separate atomic energy and economic communities to reconcile both groups.

The Intergovernmental Conference on the Common Market and Euratom at the Château of Val-Duchesse in 1956 drew up the essentials of the new treaties. Euratom would foster co-operation in the nuclear field, at the time a very popular area, and would, along with the EEC, share the Common Assembly and Court of Justice of the ECSC, but not its executives. Euratom would have its own Council and Commission, with fewer powers than the High Authority of the European Coal and Steel Community. On 25 March 1957, the Treaties of Rome (the Euratom Treaty and the EEC Treaty) were signed by the ECSC members and on 1 January 1958 they came into force.

To save on resources, these separate executives created by the Rome Treaties were merged in 1965 by the Merger Treaty. The institutions of the EEC would take over responsibilities for the running of the ECSC and Euratom, with all three then becoming known as the European Communities even if each legally existed separately. In 1993, the Maastricht Treaty created the European Union, which absorbed the Communities into the European Community pillar, yet Euratom still maintained a distinct legal personality.

The European Constitution was intended to consolidate all previous treaties and increase democratic accountability in them. The Euratom treaty had not been amended as the other treaties had, so the European Parliament had been granted few powers over it. However, the reason it had gone unamended was the same reason the Constitution left it to remain separate from the rest of the EU: anti-nuclear sentiment among the European electorate, which may unnecessarily turn voters against the treaty. The Euratom treaty thus remains in force relatively unamended from its original signing.

EU evolution timeline
This overall timeline includes the establishment and development of Euratom, and shows that currently, it is the only former EC body that has not been incorporated into the EU.

Cooperation 

 Since 2014, Switzerland has participated in Euratom programmes as an associated state.
 Since January 2021, the United Kingdom participates in Euratom programmes as an associated state under the terms of the UK-EU Trade and Cooperation Agreement.
 As of 2022, Euratom maintains Co-operation Agreements of various scopes with ten countries: Armenia, Australia, Canada, India, Japan, Kazakhstan, South Africa, Ukraine, United States, and Uzbekistan.

Withdrawal of the United Kingdom 

The United Kingdom announced its intention to withdraw from the EAEC on 26 January 2017, following on from its decision to withdraw from the European Union.  Formal notice to withdraw from the EAEC was provided in March 2017, within the Article 50 notification letter, where the withdrawal was made explicit.  Withdrawal only became effective following negotiations on the terms of the exit, which lasted two years and ten months.

A report by the House of Commons Business, Energy and Industrial Strategy Committee, published in May 2017, questioned the legal necessity of leaving Euratom and called for a temporary extension of membership to allow time for new arrangements to be made.

In June 2017, the European Commission's negotiations task force published a Position paper transmitted to EU27 on nuclear materials and safeguard equipment (Euratom), titled "Essential Principles on nuclear materials and safeguard equipment". The following month, a briefing paper from the House of Commons Library assessed the implications of leaving Euratom.

In 2017, an article in The Independent questioned the availability of nuclear fuel to the UK after 2019 if the UK were to withdraw, and the need for new treaties relating to the transportation of nuclear materials. A 2017 article in the New Scientist stated that radioisotope supply for cancer treatments would also need to be considered in new treaties.

UK politicians speculated that the UK could stay in Euratom. In 2017, some argued that this would require – beyond the consent of the EU27 – amendment or revocation of the Article 50 letter of March 2017.

The Nuclear Safeguards Act 2018, making provision for safeguards after withdrawal from Euratom, received royal assent on 26 June 2018.

The UK-EU Trade and Cooperation Agreement, outlining the UK's relationship with the European Union from 1 January 2021, makes provision for the United Kingdom's participation "as an associated country of all parts of the Euratom programme".

Achievements 
In the history of European regulation, Article 37 of the Euratom Treaty represents pioneering legislation concerning binding transfrontier obligations with respect to environmental impact and protection of humans.

President

The five-member Commission was led by only three presidents while it had independent executives (1958–1967), all from France:

See also

 EU Directorate General Joint Research Centre – often incorrectly referred to as Euratom due to EURATOM being its origin.
 Energy Community
 Energy policy of the European Union
 History of the European Union
 Institutions of the European Union
 International Atomic Energy Agency
 Nuclear energy in the European Union
 The nuclear part of the Seventh Framework Programme for research and technological development, the European Union's chief instrument for funding research.

References

External links 

 
 Treaty establishing the European Atomic Energy Community (EURATOM)
 Documents of the European Atomic Energy Community are consultable at the Historical Archives of the EU in Florence
 History of the Rome Treaties Online collection by the CVCE
European Commission Fusion Research
European Commission Fission Research

 
International nuclear energy organizations
International organizations based in Europe
Energy policies and initiatives of the European Union
European Union and science and technology
Organizations established in 1958
Intergovernmental organizations established by treaty
1958 establishments in Europe
Radiation protection organizations